Sanford Lake was a man-made reservoir located in Midland County, Michigan, but is no longer present since the failure of the dam in May 2020. It was formed by the damming of the Tittabawassee River near the town of Sanford, Michigan. It was built for flood control and the production of hydroelectric power. The dam is owned and operated by The Four Lakes Task Force, a property owners' group that was established by the Midland and Gladwin County boards of commissioners to oversee the dams and the impoundment lakes created by them, who took over ownership as a condition of the settlement agreement that resulted from the condemnation proceedings with former dam owner, Boyce Hydro, LLC.

About 
The lake was slightly over half a mile wide at its widest point. In May 2020, the Sanford Dam, as well as the Edenville Dam to the north, failed following rain and neglect of the dams. This resulted in the flooding of Sanford, Midland, Saginaw, and other surrounding areas.

Access 
Sanford Lake was a recreation spot for the county and surrounding counties. There were two public access points to the lake and many private community access points. Before 2020, pontoon boats, personal watercraft, sport fisherman, and swimmers used the lake in the summer.

Sanford Lake Park is located on the west side of the former lake near the dam. This park, maintained by Midland County, has boat ramps, a sandy beach area with volleyball and swimming, pull-up parking for boats and jet-skis, picnic pavilions, playgrounds, and a concession stand (sometimes). Access can be made by car for an entry fee or by boat.

Shoreline 
What used to be the shoreline is mostly developed with single-family homes. Many of these homes are located in small neighborhood communities which maintained private boat launch sites, picnic areas, and lake access for non-lakefront property owners. The area of the lake farther north was lined with some wetlands and wilderness areas mixed with housing. There was one small marina on the east shore of the lake (Sanford Lake Marina).

Water quality 
The water quality of the lake was great. As a reservoir with a predominantly muddy bottom, turbidity was a bit higher than the average natural lake in Michigan. The introduction of Zebra mussels in the 1990s significantly improved water clarity, but that led to an explosion of weed growth throughout the shallow portions of the lake. Significant weed control programs were attempted over recent years with varying degrees of success.

Fishing 
Sanford Lake had a wide range of Michigan species: bluegill, rock bass, perch, calicos, northern pike, crappie, catfish, walleye, smallmouth bass, largemouth bass, musky, suckers, and carp. The DNR stocked 65,000 walleye off the Sanford Lake Marina ramp in the spring of 2006. Several bass fishing competitions take place during the year, as well as a catfish derby.

2020 flood 

Following a period of heavy rain, the Edenville Dam immediately upstream overtopped and failed on May 19, 2020. The breach of the Edenville Dam in two areas of the levee caused more water to be released into the Tittabawassee River which feeds into Sanford Lake. The floodwaters quickly overran Sanford Dam, washing out its fuse plug and escaping around the sides of the dam, eventually leading to the failure of the dam. 

Sanford Dam was built in 1925 and had received a "fair" condition rating by the state, while the 1924 Edenville Dam had received a "poor" rating, though it had been deemed worthy of another hydroelectric generator by the state.  Both dams were in the process of being sold at the time of the failure to the Four Lakes Task Force (FLTF), a 'delegated authority' created by a resolution between Midland and Gladwin counties. On May 26, 2020, the FLTF announced that they were halting the acquisition of the Boyce Hydro properties under the terms and conditions negotiated in 2019, and would seek other private and public sources of funding for the eventual purchase.

References

External links 
 Sanford Lake Association website
 Sanford Lake Fireworks
 Sanford Lake Marina
 Midland County Parks - Sanford Lake Park
 Sanford Lake Improvement Board
 Sanford Lake Bar and Grill at pubcrawler website 
 Sanford Lake Catfish Derby, Sanford Lake Michigan 

Bodies of water of Midland County, Michigan
Reservoirs in Michigan
Protected areas of Midland County, Michigan